Antheua liparidioides is a moth of the  family Notodontidae. It is found in Kenya.

References

Endemic moths of Kenya
Moths described in 1910
Notodontidae
Moths of Africa